Andre Bernard Gurode (born March 6, 1978) is a former American football center and guard who is currently the Offensive line coach for the Houston Roughnecks. He played college football at the University of Colorado, where he was recognized as an earning consensus All-American, and was selected by the Cowboys in the second round of the 2002 NFL Draft. During his nine seasons with Dallas, he was named to five Pro Bowls. In his final three seasons, Gurode spent one year each for the Baltimore Ravens, Chicago Bears, and Oakland Raiders.

Gurode was born in Houston, Texas.  He played high school football at North Shore High School in Houston.  As a senior, USA Today, PrepStar and SuperPrep selected him as an honorable mention high school All-America. He was also named to the  Houston Chronicle Top 100 List and made the Austin American-Statesman "Fab 55" team.  He earned All-Area honors as a senior (second-team honors as a junior), and was All-District and All-Greater Houston as a junior and senior (when he also was his team's most outstanding offensive lineman).

Gurode lettered three times in basketball and four times in track with personal bests of 186' 0" in the discus and 54' 1" in the shot put.

College career
Gurode attended the University of Colorado, where he played for the Colorado Buffaloes football team from 1998 to 2001.  He was a four-year starter for the Buffaloes, playing both center and guard on the offensive line.  He started his first two and a half seasons at center, before moving to guard in the middle of his junior year.  As a junior in 2000, he started the first six games of the year at center and the final five games at guard.  He received the John Mack Award, as selected by the coaches for being Colorado's most outstanding offensive player and was also selected honorable mention All-Big 12 Conference honors while helping the Buffaloes to a 7–5 record and a win over the Boston College Eagles in the Insight.com Bowl.  As a senior, he started every game at right guard.

Gurode was a first-team All-Big 12 selection in 2000 and 2001, and was recognized as a consensus first-team All-American as a senior in 2001.  During his career he allowed just 7.5 sacks in 2,653 plays as a starter for the Buffaloes.

He earned a degree in ethnic studies from the University of Colorado, where he was a member of the school's "Academic Starters" team.

Professional career

2002 NFL Draft
Gurode initially projected as a guard and was ranked the best available in the 2002 NFL Draft, along with Kendall Simmons. He was regarded as an early second round pick, and was eventually selected 37th overall by the Dallas Cowboys.

Dallas Cowboys (2002–2010)
Gurode was drafted by the Dallas Cowboys in the second round of the 2002 NFL Draft as a center. He started fast by becoming the first rookie in club history to start at center on opening day.

It is believed 2002 was the first time an NFL franchise had five African-American starters on their offensive line, when the Cowboys lined up Gurode at center, tackles Flozell Adams and Solomon Page, guards Larry Allen and Kelvin Garmon. Gurode also became part of history as the starting center on the Cowboys offensive line that helped Emmitt Smith eclipse Walter Payton as the NFL's all-time leading rusher, playing against the Seattle Seahawks on October 27. While he started the first six games of the 2002 season at center, Gurode was moved to help compensate for the number of injuries along the offensive line, compiling another eight starts at right guard.

In 2003, Bill Parcells was hired as the Cowboys head coach and decided that Gurode's best position was at guard, starting 15 games at that position in 2003 and 13 games in 2004 with mixed results, before getting benched for the final two games.

At the start of the 2005 season, Parcells accepted he made a misjudgment by moving Gurode to guard and switched him back to center, with the Cowboys also signing Marco Rivera to take his place at guard. That season, he was a versatile backup, playing behind Al Johnson at center and Rivera at right guard.

In 2006, he rededicated himself to football and won the starting center job again, over Al Johnson. On October 1, 2006, in the third quarter of a game against the Tennessee Titans, Titans defensive tackle Albert Haynesworth stomped on Gurode's head. Haynesworth's cleats caused a laceration requiring thirty stitches.  Haynesworth was ejected, and subsequently suspended by the NFL for five games without pay.

Following the 2006 season, Gurode was named to his first Pro Bowl as an injury replacement. On February 20, 2007, the Cowboys re-signed Gurode to a six-year contract worth US$30 million including a $10 million signing bonus.

Gurode developed into one of the league's most respected centers since returning to being a full-time starter in 2006, and has been selected to the All-Pro Team (2007, 2009), as well as to five straight Pro Bowls (2006, 2007, 2008, 2009, 2010)

He had offseason left knee surgery and missed the 2011 season training camp and three out of four preseason games.  With the emergence of second-year player Phil Costa, he was released after the preseason following failed negotiations regarding a restructured contract.

Baltimore Ravens (2011)
Gurode reportedly visited the Detroit Lions and New England Patriots before signing a 1-year, $3 million contract with the Baltimore Ravens on September 4, 2011.

Chicago Bears (2012)
On November 27, 2012, the Chicago Bears signed Gurode after losing guards Lance Louis and Chris Spencer to injuries sustained in a game against the Minnesota Vikings on November 25. He was waived by the Bears on December 11, 2012.

Oakland Raiders (2013)
On July 26, 2013, Gurode signed with the Oakland Raiders.  At the end of the 2013 NFL season, Gurode became a free agent.

Coaching Career 
Gurode was officially hired by the Houston Roughnecks on September 13, 2022

References

External links
 Oakland Raiders bio

1978 births
Living people
All-American college football players
American football centers
American football offensive guards
Baltimore Ravens players
Colorado Buffaloes football players
Dallas Cowboys players
Chicago Bears players
Houston Roughnecks coaches
National Conference Pro Bowl players
Oakland Raiders players
Violence in sports
Players of American football from Houston
North Shore Senior High School (Texas) alumni